Mohammad Jashimuddin is a Bangladesh Awami League politician, Retired Major of Bangladesh Army and a former Jatiya Sangsad member from Bhola-3 constituency.

Career
Jashimuddin was elected to the parliament in 2008 election from Bhola-3 as a Bangladesh Awami League candidate. His rival, Hafizuddin Ahmed of Bangladesh Nationalist Party filed a petition with the court challenging the legality of election. The Bangladesh High Court ruled against him as he had been sent on forced retirement from Bangladesh Army on 31 August 2004. According to Bangladesh law, government employees who have been sent to forced retirement cannot contest elections within 5 years. By-Elections were called for Bhola-3 which was won by Bangladesh Awami league candidate Nurunnabi Chowdhury.

References

Living people
Awami League politicians
9th Jatiya Sangsad members
Year of birth missing (living people)
Place of birth missing (living people)
Bangladeshi military personnel